Conversations with Christian is a studio album by American jazz bassist Christian McBride. It was released on  via Mack Avenue label.

Background
This is the tenth album by McBride as a leader. The album is special because it consists of 13 tracks—each recorded as a duet with various popular musicians. The project began as podcasts in 2009, when McBride started interviewing his musical companions as well as playing some compositions meanwhile. The podcast eventually led to the bassist’s popular Sirius-XM radio show, The Lowdown: Conversations With Christian.

Reception
Ken Dryden of AllMusic noted "Conversations with Christian is an unusual release, as it features the veteran bassist playing duets with a number of good friends. The vocal meetings include Angélique Kidjo, Sting, and Dee Dee Bridgewater (the latter with a hilarious, funky cover of the Isley Brothers' signature song "It's Your Thing"). The pairings with musicians of McBride's generation (trumpeter Roy Hargrove, tenor saxophonist Ron Blake, and guitarist Russell Malone) all exceed expectations. There are several enjoyable duets with pianists, one featuring Latin jazz master Eddie Palmieri, a duo improvised tango by Chick Corea and the leader, plus an all too rare acoustic outing by the talented George Duke (who tears up the keyboard with his hard-charging "McDukey Blues")".

Chris Barton of Los Angeles Times stated "This year marks another active one for McBride with September's rambunctious big-band album "The Good Feeling" and this month's "Conversations With Christian," a collection of duets that rose out of a 2009 podcast series of the same name. Full of loosely intimate interplay, the results sometimes recall the try-anything spirit of McBride's guest-heavy 2006 live album "Live at Tonic". The Buffalo News review by Jeff Simon stated, "There's almost as much art on all this showing off as there is entertainment. It's a consistent delight -- though of several different kinds before it's over."

Track listing

Personnel
Band
Christian McBride – primary artist, producer

Production
Randall Kennedy – creative director
André Kimo Stone Guess – associate producer
Mat Lejeune – engineer
Fernando Lodeiro – assistant engineer

Chart performance

References

External links
 Christian McBride Discography

2011 albums
Christian McBride albums
Mack Avenue Records albums